The 2017 Limerick Premier Intermediate Hurling Championship was the fourth staging of the Limerick Premier Intermediate Hurling Championship since its establishment by the Limerick County Board in 2014.

On 18 October 2017, Murroe-Boher won the championship after a 1-21 to 1-15 defeat of Garryspillane in a final replay at the Gaelic Grounds. It was their first ever championship title in this grade.

Results

Finals

References

External links

 Limerick GAA website

Limerick Premier Intermediate Hurling Championship
Limerick Premier Intermediate Hurling Championship